KSME (96.1 FM) is a commercial radio station licensed to Greeley, Colorado. It is owned by iHeartMedia and it broadcasts a top 40 (CHR) format. The station's studio is located in Loveland at Crossroads Blvd. and I-25.

The station also broadcasts an HD Radio subchannel featuring an alternative format branded as Radio 94.9, which is named in reference to its analog translator K235BT on 94.9 FM.

History

The station broadcast a country music format as KGLL-FM, 96.1 The Eagle until October 7, 2000, when it flipped to CHR as 96.1 Kiss FM. It initially carried Rick Dees in the Morning from KIIS-FM until 2002, when it switched to a local morning show hosted by program director Chris Kelly. After being moved to the afternoon in November 2008, Kelly was replaced with Johnjay and Rich from KZZP.

In December 2017, an HD Radio simulcast of adult album alternative K235BT moved from KPAW to KSME. The call letters were previously used by a defunct radio station in Manti, Utah.

External links

 
 

SME
Greeley, Colorado
Mass media in Fort Collins, Colorado
Contemporary hit radio stations in the United States
Radio stations established in 2000
IHeartMedia radio stations